Alexandrovka is a rural locality (a village) in Kaltasinsky Selsoviet, Kaltasinsky District, Bashkortostan, Russia. The population was 98 as of 2010. There is 1 street.

Geography 
Alexandrovka is located 2 km south of Kaltasy (the district's administrative centre) by road. Kaltasy is the nearest rural locality.

References 

Rural localities in Kaltasinsky District